Collin may refer to:

People

Surname
 Collin (surname)
 Jacques Collin de Plancy (1793–1881), French occultist, demonologist and writer
 Victor Collin de Plancy (1853–1924), French diplomat, bibliophile and art collector
 Jean-Baptiste Collin de Sussy (1750–1826), senior official and politician

Given name
For information on the origin of the name Collin, see Colin (given name).
 Collin Abranches (born 1991), Indian football (soccer) player
 Collin Altamirano (born 1995), American tennis player
 Collin Ashton (born 1983), American football linebacker
 Collin Balester (born 1986), American professional baseball pitcher
 Collin Benjamin (born 1978), Namibian football midfielder
 Collin Brooks (1893–1959), frequently known as "CB", British journalist, writer, and broadcaster
 Collin Burns, speedcuber from the United States
 Collin Cameron (born 1988), Canadian paralympic sitskier
 Collin Chou (born 1967), Chinese actor
 Collin Circelli (born 1981), Canadian ice hockey center
 Collin Cowgill (born 1986), American baseball outfielder
 Collin Dean (born 2005), American actor
 Collin Delia (born 1994), American ice hockey goaltender
 Collin d'Harleville (1755–1806), French dramatist
 Collin Drafts (born 1985), former American football quarterback
 Collin Dyer, businessman and politician, member of the National Assembly of Seychelles
 Collin Edwards (born 1982), stage name Demarco, Jamaican dancehall and reggae recording artist
 Collin Eustis, American Cyber Security Expert
 Collin van Eijk (born 1991), Dutch footballer, who most recently played for Belgian side Spouwen-Mopertingen
 Collin Fernandez (born 1997), American-Peruvian soccer player
 Collin Finnerty, Duke University lacrosse player who was falsely accused of rape and kidnapping in 2006
 Collin Ryan Fitzgerald, MMV, Canadian soldier who received the Medal of Military Valour
 Collin Franklin (born 1988), former American football tight end
 Collin Freeland (born 1933), AO, former senior Australian public servant and policymaker
 Collin Gillespie (born 1999), American college basketball player for the Villanova Wildcats
 Collin Hansen (born 1981), American journalist and editorial director for The Gospel Coalition
 Collin Hegna, American indie rock musician
 Collin Johnson (born 1997), American football wide receiver
 Collin Klein (born 1989), Canadian Football quarterback 
 Collin Martin (born 1994), American soccer player
 Collin McHugh (born 1987), American baseball pitcher
 Collin McKinney (1766–1861), American land surveyor, merchant, politician, and lay preacher
 Collin McLoughlin, American music producer, DJ, and singer
 Collin Mitchell (born 1969), Canadian curler  
 Collin Mooney (born 1986), American football fullback
 Collin Morikawa (born 1997), American professional golfer
 Collin Peterson (born 1944), US Congressman of Minnesota
 Collin Pryor (born 1990), American-Icelandic basketball player
 Collin Quaner (born 1991), German football (soccer) player
 Collin Raye (born 1960), American country singer
 Collin Rogers (1791–1845), American master builder and neoclassical architect
 Collin Samuel (born 1981), Trinidad and Tobago footballer
 Collin Seedorf (born 1995), Dutch football player
 Collin Sexton (born 1999), American basketball player
 Collin Sixpence (born 1974), Zimbabwean sculptor
 Collin Taylor (born 1987), arena football player for the Albany Empire
 Collin Thompson, Toronto, Canada-born Hong Kong based fashion designer, filmmaker, and figure skater
 Collin van Eijk (born 1991), Dutch football player
 Collin Walcott (1945–1984), North American musician
 Collin Westby (born 1995), Belizean international footballer 
 Collin Wilcox (actress) (1935–2009), American actress
 Collin Wilcox (writer) (1924–1996), American mystery writer
 Collin Williams (born 1961), Zimbabwean first-class cricketer
 Collin H. Woodward (died 1927), New York City politician

Middle name
 Isabelle Collin Dufresne (1935–2014), stage name Ultra Violet, French-American artist and author
 William Collin Snavely, known as Diagram of Suburban Chaos, composer of electronic music
 John Collin Underhay (1829–1919), Canadian farmer, land surveyor and political figure in Prince Edward Island

Fictional characters
 Collin Fenwick, protagonist and narrator of Truman Capote's 1951 novella The Grass Harp

Places
 Collin (District Electoral Area), district electoral area in Belfast, Northern Ireland
 Collin, Dumfries and Galloway, a village in Scotland
 Collin, Texas, an unincorporated community
 Collin College, a community college district serving Collin and Rockwall counties, north and northeast of Dallas, Texas
 Collin County, Texas
 Collin House, a listed Neoclassical property in Copenhagen, Denmark
 Collin Lake 223, an Indian reserve in northeast Alberta, Canada
 Collin railway station, on the Ballymena and Larne Railway which ran from Ballymena to Larne in Northern Ireland
 Collin River (Chile)
 Collin River (Mégiscane River tributary), Quebec, Canada
 Kolín, Czech Republic, sometimes rendered as Collin in English and German

See also
 
 
 Collina (disambiguation)
 Colline
 Collins (disambiguation)
 Colin (disambiguation)
 Kollin
 Colling

English masculine given names
Masculine given names